Boremel is a village in the Dubno Raion in Rivne Oblast in western Ukraine, but was formerly administered within Demydivka Raion. The population is 866 inhabitants.

History
First time mentioned in 1366. 

Yosef Weitz and Wincenty Krasiński were born here.

During World War II, the local Jewish population was kept imprisoned in a ghetto. In September 1942, an Einsatzgruppen perpetrated a mass execution killing 700 Jews according to Soviet archives.

References

Holocaust locations in Ukraine

Villages in Dubno Raion